Between 1891 and 1985 the Principal Architect of the  Public Works Department (Western Australia) was responsible for the delivery of the state government’s public buildings capital works program throughout Western Australia.

In 2003 the government of Premier Geoff Gallop re-established the office as the Government Architect (now part of the Department of Planning, Lands and Heritage), with the purpose of improving "the design of public buildings and spaces to enhance the quality of the built environment in WA."

Prior to 1891
Prior to 1901, the Principal Architect was called the Superintendent of Public Works or Clerk of Works or Director of Public Works. Refer to Public Works Department (Western Australia). Those who served in these roles were:

1829-1838 Henry Willey Reveley
1839-1851 Henry Trigg
1851-1853 James Austin
1853-1884 Richard Roach Jewell
1885-1891 John Arthur Wright, Clayton T Mason and George Temple-Poole

Principal Architects
Those who served the State in the role of Principal Architect were as follows:

1891 – 1897 George Temple-Poole
1897 – 1905 John Harry Grainger
1905 – 1917 Hillson Beasley
1917 – 1927 William Burden Hardwick
1927 – 1930 John Melvin James Tait
1930 – 1960 Albert Ernest (Paddy) Clare
1960 – 1967 Walter Green
1967 – 1968 Leonard Walters
1968 – 1980 Stanley Cann
1980 – 1985 William Bateman

Government Architects
2004 – 2009 Geoffrey London
2009 – 2013 Steve Woodland
2013 – 2020 Geoff Warn
2020 - (Current) Rebecca Moore

References

External links
Office of the Government Architect

Architects from Western Australia